The 2014 Southwark Council election took place on 22 May 2014 to elect members of Southwark Council in England. This was on the same day as other local elections.

Labour retained control winning 48 seats (+13). The Liberal Democrats won 13 seats (-12) and the Conservatives won 2 seats (-1).

Summary of results

Results by ward

Brunswick Park

Camberwell Green

Cathedrals

Chaucer

College

East Dulwich

East Walworth

Faraday

Grange 

Emmanuel Oyewole was a sitting councillor for Camberwell Green ward

Livesey

Newington
Southwark Council results website

Nunhead

Note: Althea Smith was elected in 2010 for the Labour Party, but defected to the All People's Party.

Peckham

Peckham Rye

Riverside

Rotherhithe

South Bermondsey

South Camberwell 

Columba Blango was a sitting councillor for Rotherhithe ward

Denise Capstick was a sitting councillor for Grange ward

Surrey Docks

The Lane

Village

By-Elections 2014-2018

The by-election was called following the resignation of Councillor Claire Maugham.

The by-election was called following the resignation of Councillor Helen Hayes, the Member of Parliament for Dulwich and West Norwood.

The by election was called following the resignation of Councillor Neil Coyle, the Member of Parliament for Bermondsey and Old Southwark.

The by-election was called following the resignation of Councillor Lisa Rajan.

References

Southwark
2014
21st century in the London Borough of Southwark